Hispania Ulterior (English: "Further Hispania", or occasionally "Thither Hispania") was a region of Hispania during the Roman Republic, roughly located in Baetica and in the Guadalquivir valley of modern Spain and extending to all of Lusitania (modern Portugal, Extremadura and a small part of Salamanca province) and Gallaecia (modern Northern Portugal and Galicia). Its capital was Corduba.

Etymology
Hispania is the Latin term given to the Iberian peninsula. The term can be traced back to at least 200 BC when the term was used by the poet Quintus Ennius. The word is possibly derived from the Punic אי שפן "I-Shaphan" meaning "coast of hyraxes", in turn a misidentification on the part of Phoenician explorers of its numerous rabbits as hyraxes. Ulterior is the comparative form of ulter, which means "that is beyond". According to ancient historian Cassius Dio, the people of the region came from many different tribes.  They did not share a common language or a common government.

History
After losing control of Sicily, Sardinia and Corsica in the First Punic War, Carthage began to expand into the south of the Iberian peninsula. Soon afterwards, the Second Punic War began. Much of that war between Carthage and Rome took place in Hispania until Scipio Africanus effectively seized control of Hispania from Hannibal and the Carthaginians in the Battle of Ilipa in 206 BC.  Four years later, Carthage surrendered and ceded its control of the region to Rome after Carthage's defeat in 201 BC.

In 197 BC, the peninsula was divided into two provinces because of the presence of two military forces during its conquest. These two regions were Hispania Citerior (Nearer Hispania) and Hispania Ulterior (Further Hispania). The boundary was generally along a line passing from Carthago Nova to the Cantabrian Sea. Hispania Ulterior consisted of what are now Andalusia, Portugal, Extremadura, Castilla y León, Galicia, Asturias, Cantabria, and the Basque Country.

There was peace in the region until 155 BC when the Lusitanians attacked Hispania Ulterior. Twice defeating Roman praetors, their success soon sparked a number of other rebellions in the peninsula. The Iberian peninsula became a centre of military activity and an opportunity for advancement. As Appian claimed, “[the consuls] took the command not for the advantage of the city [Rome], but for glory, or gain, or the honour of a triumph.”  The area was largely conquered by the consul Decimus Junius Brutus Callaicus in 138 BC, but war continued until 19 BC when Agrippa defeated the Cantabrians in Hispania Citerior and Hispania finally was completely conquered. That same year, with the subjugation of all Hispania and the end of the Cantabrian Wars, Augustus reorganised the provinces in the peninsula. Hispania Ulterior was divided into Baetica (modern Andalusia) and Lusitania (modern Portugal, Extremadura, and part of Castilla-León). Hispania Citerior, which now included Cantabria and Basque country, was renamed Hispania Tarraconensis.

In the early fifth-century AD, the Vandals invaded and took over the south of Hispania. The Roman Emperor Honorius commissioned his brother-in-law, the Visigoth king, Athaulf, to defeat the Vandals. The Visigoths seized control of Hispania and made Toledo the capital of their country.

Roman effects on Hispania

Each province was to be ruled by a praetor. Members of the tribal elite of Hispania were introduced into the Roman aristocracy and allowed to participate in their own governance. Roman emperors Trajan, Hadrian and Theodosius I were all born in Hispania. Roman latifundia were granted to members of the aristocracy throughout the region. Cities in Hispania Citerior such as Valencia were enhanced and irrigation aqueducts were introduced. The economy thrived as a granary as well as by exporting gold, olive oil, wool, and wine.

See also
 Pre-Roman peoples of the Iberian Peninsula

References

 Strabo. The Geography of Strabo; with an English translation by Horace Leonard Jones.(Loeb Classical Library.) Vol. II. London: Heinemann, 1923.

External links
 Detailed map of the Pre-Roman Peoples of Iberia (around 200 BC)

Roman provinces in Hispania
Provinces of the Roman Republic
History of Córdoba, Spain
States and territories established in the 2nd century BC
197 BC
190s BC establishments
2nd-century BC establishments in Spain
2nd-century BC establishments in the Roman Republic
States and territories disestablished in the 1st century BC
1st century BC in Hispania
1st-century BC disestablishments in the Roman Empire
1st-century BC disestablishments
1st-millennium BC disestablishments in Spain
Establishments in Spain in the Roman era
Portugal in the Roman era